Robin Zander is the debut solo album from American singer Robin Zander of Cheap Trick, released in 1993 by Interscope.

Background
When Cheap Trick parted from their label, Epic, in 1991, Zander felt he had the opportunity to record a solo album while the band secured a new record deal. Zander told Billboard in 1993: "It just seemed like the right time. There's absolutely no dissatisfaction within the Cheap Trick realm. It's sort of like when you have this career, you need a hobby on the side. That's how I think of it." Speaking of the album itself, Zander commented: "It's not a half-baked Cheap Trick album. A lot of the solo albums I've heard over the years sound just like the band the person used to be in, or is in, and I didn't want to do that."

Song information
"I've Always Got You" was released as a single and peaked at No. 13 on the Billboard Mainstream Rock chart. "Show Me Heaven" was released as the second and final single from the album.

"Emily" was written with David A. Stewart (of the Eurythmics) and features Cheap Trick bassist Tom Petersson on bass guitar. "Secret" was written with the songwriting team Billy Steinberg and Tom Kelly along with Rick Nielsen, lead guitarist of Cheap Trick. Cheap Trick later performed "Time Will Let You Know" live in 2000, which was released the following year on their live release Silver. Holland Zander, Robin Zander's daughter and former lead singer of The Snaggs, made a guest appearance to sing a duet version of the track. The song "Walkin' Shoes" was re-recorded for Zander's intended 2010 solo follow-up Countryside Blvd..

For the German version of the "I've Always Got You" single, an extra non-album track was added, "Stone Cold Rhythm Shake", written and originally performed by singer/songwriter Robert Vaughan on his 1991 album Songs from the Riverhouse. The track was added as a bonus track to the Japanese version of the Robin Zander album.

Reception

Upon release, Mark Blackwell of Spin commented: "...yawn as you mist as the prospect, Zander has "surrendered" his debut, and has actually done a damn fine job of it. From the opening Mellencamp-Petty-esque riffs of the drivin'-down-the-highway-with-the-top-down pop of "Reactionary Girl" to the Queen-10cc-esque layered balladry of "Time Will Let You Know," Zander digs through his classic rock collection to appropriate a wide variety of styles - almost every track has a different, recognizable feel, the least "in-effect" of which is standard Cheap Trick power pop."

Pan-European magazine Music & Media considered the album to "boast a bewildering array of different styles, although the respect for "the song" always remains the focal point." They added: "Zander not only proves to be a very able songwriter himself, he also knows how to pick songs by others and turn them into something of his own." Billboard described the album as "well-sung", but one that "unfortunately suffers from underambitious writing and song selection". They added: "The best tracks here have the snap of Zander's finest work with [Cheap Trick], but much of the remainder just doesn't match the quality of the singing."

Tom Demalon of AllMusic retrospectively said: "It's a balanced mix of taut, power pop, heartfelt ballads, and tasty covers. Zander's not redefining pi here. Instead, it's fifty minutes of well-crafted rock delivered by one of the most-gifted vocalists and frontmen in rock history."

Track listing

Personnel 

 Robin Zander – vocals, keyboards, acoustic guitar, electric guitar, strings arranger
Additional Musicians
 Peter Asher – drum programming
 Christina Amphlett – guest vocals
 David Bianco – mixer
 Gregg Bissonette – drums
 Robbie Buchanan – keyboards
 Paul Buckmaster – conductor, strings arranger
 Kim Bullard – keyboards, synthesizers
 Mike Campbell – guitar, resonator guitar, synthesizer, bass guitar, keyboards, producer
 James "Jae-E" Earley – drum programming, keyboards
 Don Felder – guitar solo
 Steve Ferris – guitar
 Mike Fisher – percussion
 Mick Fleetwood – drums
 Derrick Forbes – bass guitar
 Bobbye Hall – percussion
 Bonnie Hayes – keyboards
 Scott Humphrey – keyboards, synthesizer
 Dr. John – piano
 Rob Laufer – guitar
 Patrick Leonard – piano, organ, synthesizer
 Mick MacNeil – keyboards, co-producer, programmer
 Linda Mae McCrary – choir
 Alfred McCrary – choir
 Brian McGee – drums
 Maria McKee – additional vocals on "Show Me Heaven", drum programming
 Stevie Nicks – additional vocals
 Edna Wright Perry – choir
 Tom Petersson – bass guitar on "Emily"
 Nathaniel Phillips – bass guitar
 Tim Pierce – acoustic guitar, electric guitar
 Richard Ruce – bass guitar
 Alfie Silas – choir
 J.D. Souther – additional vocals
 David A. Stewart – guitar
 Gary Taylar – guitar
 Benmont Tench – organ, electric piano
 Carlos Vega – drums, drum programming, percussion
 Brian O. Who – piano and keyboard arranger

Production
 Martin Brumbach – assistant engineer
 Bob Clearmountain – mixer
 Matt Dike – engineer, producer
 James "Jae-E" Earley - engineer, producer
 Rob Hart – assistant engineer
 Jimmy Iovine – producer
 Rob Jacobs – additional engineer, mixer
 Phil Kaffel – associate producer, engineer
 Mick MacNeil - co-producer
 Brian Scheuble – engineer
 Robin Zander - producer

Charts

References

1993 debut albums
Robin Zander albums
Interscope Records albums
Albums produced by Jimmy Iovine
Albums arranged by Paul Buckmaster